Gigaom is a technology focused analyst firm and media company. The company evolved from a blog which offered news, analysis, and opinions on startup companies, emerging technologies, and other technology related topics. It was started by Om Malik in San Francisco, California and was acquired by Knowingly Corp. in 2015.

History
After running his personal blog under the name for several years, Gigaom was founded as a company by Om Malik in 2006.

In June 2006, he left his day job at Business 2.0 magazine to work on Gigaom full-time.

The site originally integrated several other technology-related blogs and services into its network. In 2011, Gigaom consolidated this network of blogs and rebranded all of them as separate topic channels on gigaom.com, with channels dedicated to technology news, Apple, cleantech, cloud computing, data, Europe, mobile technology, and digital video.

Since 2006, Gigaom has organized technology conferences under the banner Gigaom Events. Former Gigaom employees founded Structure, an independent conference business in order to host some of the events. For its first conference, Structure gave free tickets to those who lost money on tickets to Gigaom's canceled conference in March and sponsors who had sponsored the canceled event got 90 percent of the money they lost to sponsor Structure's first conference.

In 2008, Malik appointed Paul Walborsky as CEO of the company and in 2009, the company launched GigaOM Pro, a subscription-based technology research service. Walborsky stepped down as CEO in September 2014.

On February 8, 2012, Gigaom acquired PaidContent through the acquisition of ContentNext Media.

On March 9, 2015, Gigaom ceased operations, with a brief note on the website stating that it was shutting down and "its assets are now controlled by the company's lenders." Malik stated that the publication was unable to pay its creditors in full. At the time, it had 6.4 million monthly readers.

On May 22, 2015, Gigaom was acquired by Knowingly Corp., which started publishing new content to the site in August 2015.

See also
 TechRepublic
 Boy Genius Report
 Gizmodo
 Mashable
 Re/code
 TechCrunch

 The Verge
 ZDNet

References

External links

 

Research and analysis firms of the United States
American technology news websites
Websites about digital media
Internet properties established in 2006
Companies based in San Francisco